is a railway station on the Yahiko Line in the city of Sanjō, Niigata, Japan, operated by East Japan Railway Company (JR East).

Lines
Kita-Sanjō Station is served by the Yahiko Line and is 15.4 kilometers from the terminus of the line at Yahiko Station.

Station layout
The station consists of  one elevated side platform serving one bi-directional track. The station has a Midori no Madoguchi staffed ticket office.

History
Kita-Sanjō Station opened on 10 April 1925. With the privatization of Japanese National Railways (JNR) on 1 April 1987, the station came under the control of JR East.

Passenger statistics
In fiscal 2017, the station was used by an average of 393 passengers daily (boarding passengers only).

Surrounding area
Sanjō City Hall
Sanjō Post Office

See also
 List of railway stations in Japan

References

External links

  

Railway stations in Niigata Prefecture
Railway stations in Japan opened in 1925
Stations of East Japan Railway Company
Yahiko Line
Sanjō, Niigata